Meir Shamir is an Israeli businessman, he is currently the chief executive officer and main shareholder of Mivtach Shamir Holdings Ltd. Shamir is an active philanthropist and since 2012, has served as the Head of "Taglit Israel" (Birthright Israel).

Early life and education
Shamir was born in 1951 in Kibbutz Be'erot Yitzhak and relocated to Petah Tikva with his family upon turning five years old, where he was later raised and educated. In 1969, Shamir joined the Israel Defence Forces (IDF) as a Navigator in the 69 Squadron ("Hammers") of the Israeli Air Force, and took part in the Yom Kippur War. After completing his military service, he pursued a BA in Management, Business Administration and Economics from Bar-Ilan University.

Career
Shamir began working as an Insurance Agent at Mivtach, a subsidiary of the Sahar Insurance Group. In 1981, at the age of 30, Shamir purchased 50% of the company's shares and changed its name to Mivtach Shamir Holdings Ltd. In 1992 Shamir went on to purchase the remaining shares of the company, thus becoming its sole owner and director. In the following years, Shamir sold the company's insurance business, turning it into an internationally active Israel-based investment company that invests mainly in technology and communications, real estate and industrial companies.

Under Shamir's leadership the company's market value in the stock exchange grew from 20 million NIS (approx. $5.6 million) in 1992 to 830 million NIS (approx. $230 million) by Jun/2017.

Mivtach Shamir is a diverse and active company in Israel and around the world, investing in the fields of technology and communications, income-producing real estate and venture capital, with a special focus on medical, biotechnology and biotechnology companies. Some of the companies in which Mivtach Shamir has invested in include; Tnuva Food Corporation, Alony-Hetz, Gilat Satellite Networks, Taldor/Eldor, Solbar and Scitex, as well as the high-tech company Lipman Electronics (now VeriFone Israel), which deals with clearing and securing online money transfers.

Shamir himself, serves on the boards of several of the companies controlled by Mivtach Shamir.

In 2007 Mivtach Shamir invested $15 million in TVJ (Tower Vision Jersey), an Indian company. Two months later Mivtach Real Estate, which is a subsidiary of Mivtach Shamir, invested $13 million in commercial property and land in Chennai, India as part of an investment group that put $30 million into the development project. The aim of the investment was to build offices, hotels, commercial centers and other complexes over 2.25 million sqm of the city. According to the signed agreement, in exchange for their investment, Mivtach would receive 32% of the project's shares.

In 2015, Shamir's company invested $7 million in a promising information security start-up named Nyotron. Mivtach Shamir also held a 21% stake in the Israeli Tnuva Group, and played a crucial part in its acquisition by Brightfood China in 2015, a deal which earned Mivtach Shamir €252 million.

Philanthropy

Personal contribution
Shamir supports summer camps and day-care centres for underprivileged children and youths in the Israeli periphery.

In 2009 he received an honorary doctorate from the Bar Ilan University "in recognition of his pivotal role in Israel's business sector…and his generous support of underprivileged university students." He has served on the university's Board of Trustees since 2005, contributed to the Bible Studies Department and funded student scholarships.

Shamir has been Head of the Presidency of Taglit Israel since 2012.

Corporate contribution
In 2015 Mivtach Shamir donated a state-of-the-art ambulance to the ZAKA emergency response teams in Petah Tikva.

The company has sponsored several IDF units and battalions and funded their recreational activities as part of the Association for the Wellbeing of Israel's Soldiers (AWIS) Adoption project – Ametz Lohem (adopt a soldier).

Hapoel Petah Tikva
Meir Shamir was the owner of the football club Hapoel Petah Tikva F.C., sold the stadium and disappeared with the money.
https://www.haaretz.co.il/sport/israel-soccer/1.2595130

Personal details
Meir Shamir is married to professor Adina Shamir of the Bar Ilan University. They have three children.

His personal net worth is estimated at $150 million.

References

1951 births
Living people
Israeli chief executives
Bar-Ilan University alumni